Muhammad Ibn Qasim was an Alid Imam.

Ibn Qasim led an Alid rebellion in Taloqan at the beginning of the 3rd century of Hijrah (A.H.), in the year 219 AH (834 CE), during the days of the Abbasid Caliphate of Al-Mu'tasim. However, Al-Mu'tasim defeated and arrested him and carried him to Baghdad, detaining him in his palace. 

Shortly after, Muhammad was able to escape, and was never heard of again. Some people believed that Ibn Qasim died, or fled, while some of the Shiites believed he was alive and would reappear and that he was the Mahdi.

See also
List of fugitives from justice who disappeared

References

External links
Al-Farq bayn al-Firaq, by Al-Isfirayini, p.31
Maqatil al-Talibiyyin, by Abu al-Faraj al-Isfahani, p.577 

9th-century Arabs
9th-century people from the Abbasid Caliphate
Arab rebels
Fugitives
Hashemite people
Khurasan under the Abbasid Caliphate
Place of birth unknown
Prisoners and detainees of the Abbasid Caliphate
Shia imams
Year of birth unknown
Year of death unknown